2-Bromobutane is an isomer of 1-bromobutane.  Both compounds share the molecular formula C4H9Br.  2-Bromobutane is also known as sec-butyl bromide or methylethylbromomethane.  Because it contains bromine, a halogen, it is part of a larger class of compounds known as alkyl halides.  It is a colorless liquid with a pleasant odor. Because the carbon atom connected to the bromine is connected to two other carbons the molecule is referred to as a secondary alkyl halide. 2-Bromobutane is chiral and thus can be obtained as either of two enantiomers designated as (R)-(−)-2-bromobutane and (S)-(+)-2-bromobutane.

2-Bromobutane is relatively stable, but is toxic and flammable.  When treated with a strong base, it is prone to undergo an E2 reaction, which is a bimolecular elimination reaction, resulting in (predominantly) 2-butene, an alkene (double bond). 2-Bromobutane is an irritant, and harmful if ingested. It can irritate and burn skin and eyes.

References

Bromoalkanes